Grove House is a Grade II* listed house at Roehampton Lane, Roehampton, London.

It was built in 1777 by James Wyatt for Sir Joshua Vanneck, but has later alterations and additions.

It is part of Froebel College, University of Roehampton.

References

External links
 

University of Roehampton
Grade II* listed houses in London
Houses in the London Borough of Wandsworth
Houses completed in the 18th century
James Wyatt buildings